This is an incomplete list of islands of Estonia. There are 2355 islands in total.

Largest islands

Incomplete list

See also 
List of islands in the Baltic Sea
List of islands

Notes

References 

 
Estonia
Islands